SM Jinjiang is a mall in Jinjiang, Fujian, China, as part of expansion of SM Prime Holdings Philippines. It is owned and operated by SM Prime Holdings, under the management of Henry Sy, a Filipino-Chinese business tycoon. The exterior of SM City Jinjiang is similar to the old exterior of SM City North EDSA.

See also
Other SM Malls in China
SM City Chengdu
SM City Xiamen
SM Lifestyle Center

References

External links
SM Jinjiang (泉州晋江SM国际广场) 

Buildings and structures in Fujian
Shopping malls in China
Jinjiang